The 1st constituency of the Aisne is a French legislative constituency in the Aisne département.

Description

Aisne's 1st constituency stretches from the centre of the department to its eastern border, and includes the city of Laon. The seat was held by one man, René Dosière, from 1988 to 2017, with the exception of between 1993 and 1997, when it was captured the Gaullist RPR.

Unusually the second round at the 2012 election featured two candidates from the left René Dosière and Fawaz Karimet of the official Socialist Party.

The constituency was taken by Aude Bono-Vandorme as part of the En Marche! landslide victory in the 2017 election.

Historic Representation

Election results

2022

2017

2012

|- style="background-color:#E9E9E9;text-align:center;"
! colspan="2" rowspan="2" style="text-align:left;" | Candidate
! rowspan="2" colspan="2" style="text-align:left;" | Party
! colspan="2" | 1st round
! colspan="2" | 2nd round
|- style="background-color:#E9E9E9;text-align:center;"
! width="75" | Votes
! width="30" | %
! width="75" | Votes
! width="30" | %
|-
| style="background-color:" |
| style="text-align:left;" | René Dosiere
| style="text-align:left;" | Miscellaneous Left
| DVG
| 
| 29.11%
| 
| 42.19%
|-
| style="background-color:" |
| style="text-align:left;" | Aude Bono
| style="text-align:left;" | New Centre-Presidential Majority
| NC
| 
| 26.49%
| 
| 38.60%
|-
| style="background-color:" |
| style="text-align:left;" | Fawaz Karimet
| style="text-align:left;" | Socialist Party
| PS
| 
| 21.47%
| 
| 19.21%
|-
| style="background-color:" |
| style="text-align:left;" | Jean-Louis Roux
| style="text-align:left;" | National Front
| FN
| 
| 15.81%
| colspan="2" style="text-align:left;" |
|-
| style="background-color:" |
| style="text-align:left;" | Claudine Brunet
| style="text-align:left;" | Left Front
| FG
| 
| 3.82%
| colspan="2" style="text-align:left;" |
|-
| style="background-color:" |
| style="text-align:left;" | Claire Bril
| style="text-align:left;" | Ecologist
| ECO
| 
| 0.78%
| colspan="2" style="text-align:left;" |
|-
| style="background-color:" |
| style="text-align:left;" | Marie-Paule Gosset
| style="text-align:left;" | Miscellaneous Right
| DVD
| 
| 0.72%
| colspan="2" style="text-align:left;" |
|-
| style="background-color:" |
| style="text-align:left;" | Jean-Loup Pernelle
| style="text-align:left;" | Far Left
| EXG
| 
| 0.67%
| colspan="2" style="text-align:left;" |
|-
| style="background-color:" |
| style="text-align:left;" | Carole Philippot
| style="text-align:left;" | Ecologist
| ECO
| 
| 0.62%
| colspan="2" style="text-align:left;" |
|-
| style="background-color:" |
| style="text-align:left;" | Damien Peiffer
| style="text-align:left;" | Miscellaneous Right
| DVD
| 
| 0.52%
| colspan="2" style="text-align:left;" |
|-
| colspan="8" style="background-color:#E9E9E9;"|
|- style="font-weight:bold"
| colspan="4" style="text-align:left;" | Total
| 
| 100%
| 
| 100%
|-
| colspan="8" style="background-color:#E9E9E9;"|
|-
| colspan="4" style="text-align:left;" | Registered voters
| 
| style="background-color:#E9E9E9;"|
| 
| style="background-color:#E9E9E9;"|
|-
| colspan="4" style="text-align:left;" | Blank/Void ballots
| 
| 1.18%
| 
| 2.29%
|-
| colspan="4" style="text-align:left;" | Turnout
| 
| 59.44%
| 
| 58.33%
|-
| colspan="4" style="text-align:left;" | Abstentions
| 
| 40.56%
| 
| 41.67%
|-
| colspan="8" style="background-color:#E9E9E9;"|
|- style="font-weight:bold"
| colspan="6" style="text-align:left;" | Result
| colspan="2" style="background-color:" | DVG HOLD
|}

2007

|- style="background-color:#E9E9E9;text-align:center;"
! colspan="2" rowspan="2" style="text-align:left;" | Candidate
! rowspan="2" colspan="2" style="text-align:left;" | Party
! colspan="2" | 1st round
! colspan="2" | 2nd round
|- style="background-color:#E9E9E9;text-align:center;"
! width="75" | Votes
! width="30" | %
! width="75" | Votes
! width="30" | %
|-
| style="background-color:" |
| style="text-align:left;" | René Dosiere
| style="text-align:left;" | Miscellaneous Left
| DVG
| 
| 25.06%
| 
| 56.28%
|-
| style="background-color:" |
| style="text-align:left;" | Gaëdic Blanchard-Douchain
| style="text-align:left;" | Union for a Popular Movement
| UMP
| 
| 29.62%
| 
| 43.72%
|-
| style="background-color:" |
| style="text-align:left;" | Fawz Karimet
| style="text-align:left;" | Socialist Party
| PS
| 
| 20.17%
| colspan="2" style="text-align:left;" |
|-
| style="background-color:" |
| style="text-align:left;" | Jean-Louis Roux
| style="text-align:left;" | National Front
| FN
| 
| 5.68%
| colspan="2" style="text-align:left;" |
|-
| style="background-color:" |
| style="text-align:left;" | Eric Delhaye
| style="text-align:left;" | Democratic Movement
| MoDem
| 
| 4.50%
| colspan="2" style="text-align:left;" |
|-
| style="background-color:" |
| style="text-align:left;" | Nicolas Trevillot
| style="text-align:left;" | Miscellaneous Right
| DVD
| 
| 2.72%
| colspan="2" style="text-align:left;" |
|-
| style="background-color:" |
| style="text-align:left;" | Paul Henry Hansen-Catta
| style="text-align:left;" | Divers
| DIV
| 
| 2.59%
| colspan="2" style="text-align:left;" |
|-
| style="background-color:" |
| style="text-align:left;" | Claudine Brunet
| style="text-align:left;" | Communist
| COM
| 
| 2.11%
| colspan="2" style="text-align:left;" |
|-
| style="background-color:" |
| style="text-align:left;" | Marie-Claude Laffiac
| style="text-align:left;" | Far Left
| EXG
| 
| 2.01%
| colspan="2" style="text-align:left;" |
|-
| style="background-color:" |
| style="text-align:left;" | Catherine Arribas
| style="text-align:left;" | The Greens
| VEC
| 
| 1.87%
| colspan="2" style="text-align:left;" |
|-
| style="background-color:" |
| style="text-align:left;" | Sylvie Legras
| style="text-align:left;" | Movement for France
| MPF
| 
| 1.49%
| colspan="2" style="text-align:left;" |
|-
| style="background-color:" |
| style="text-align:left;" | Jean-Loup Pernelle
| style="text-align:left;" | Far Left
| EXG
| 
| 1.38%
| colspan="2" style="text-align:left;" |
|-
| style="background-color:" |
| style="text-align:left;" | Louisette Bibaut
| style="text-align:left;" | Hunting, Fishing, Nature, Traditions
| CPNT
| 
| 0.61%
| colspan="2" style="text-align:left;" |
|-
| style="background-color:" |
| style="text-align:left;" | Pascal Matis
| style="text-align:left;" | Divers
| DIV
| 
| 0.19%
| colspan="2" style="text-align:left;" |
|-
| colspan="8" style="background-color:#E9E9E9;"|
|- style="font-weight:bold"
| colspan="4" style="text-align:left;" | Total
| VALID VOTES
| 100%
| VALID VOTES
| 100%
|-
| colspan="8" style="background-color:#E9E9E9;"|
|-
| colspan="4" style="text-align:left;" | Registered voters
| 
| style="background-color:#E9E9E9;"|
| 
| style="background-color:#E9E9E9;"|
|-
| colspan="4" style="text-align:left;" | Blank/Void ballots
| 
| 1.87%
| 
| 3.16%
|-
| colspan="4" style="text-align:left;" | Turnout
| 
| 61.35%
| 
| 62.12%
|-
| colspan="4" style="text-align:left;" | Abstentions
| 
| 38.65%
| 
| 37.88%
|-
| colspan="8" style="background-color:#E9E9E9;"|
|- style="font-weight:bold"
| colspan="6" style="text-align:left;" | Result
| colspan="2" style="background-color:" | DVG GAIN
|}

References

Sources
 Official results of French elections from 1998: 

1